Jan Kopic (born 4 June 1990) is a Czech football player who currently plays for Viktoria Plzeň in the Czech First League. He has represented the Czech Republic at under-21 level. He is the younger brother of Czech footballer Milan Kopic.

International career

International goals
Scores and results list the Czech Republic's goal tally first.

References

External links
 Profile at iDNES.cz

Czech footballers
Czech Republic youth international footballers
Czech Republic under-21 international footballers
Czech Republic international footballers
Czech First League players
1990 births
People from Humpolec
Living people
FC Vysočina Jihlava players
FK Jablonec players
Association football midfielders
FC Viktoria Plzeň players
FK Čáslav players
Sportspeople from the Vysočina Region